The 2013 Trophée d'Or Féminin  will be the 17th edition of a women's cycle stage race held in France. The tour will be held from 24 August to 28 August, 2013. The tour has an UCI rating of 2.2.

Stages

Stage 1
24 August Saint-Amand-Montrond to Graçay

Stage 2
25 August Mehun-sur-Yèvre to Mehun sur Yèvre (ITT)

Stage 3
25 August La Chapelle-Saint-Ursin to La Chapelle St Ursin

Stage 4
26 August Cosne-Cours-sur-Loire to Cosne Cours Sur Loire

Stage 5
26 August Baugy to Baugy

Stage 6
26 August Orval to Saint-Amand-Montrond

Classification leadership

References

External links
 www.trophee-d-or.fr

International cycle races hosted by France
2013 in French sport
2013 in women's road cycling